The Lower Lena Hydropower Project of the 1970s assumed the creation of a hydro plant on the river Lena at the place which is close to its mouth with installed capacity 20 GW and annual production above 100 TWh. The Lower Lena HPP (Nizhnelenskaya HES) was envisioned as an effort to improve navigation conditions in the lower flow of the river for large scale ships upstream to Yakutsk. The location of the proposed HPP was chosen on the base of convenient landscape at this place, which includes narrow river channel and highland topography.

In the case of realization of this project the hydro power plant and its reservoir would have following parameters:

References

Unbuilt buildings and structures in Russia
Cancelled projects in the Soviet Union